Leinster colleges senior hurling "A" championship, is the top level hurling championship for secondary schools in Leinster. The winners receive the Corn ui Dhuill and advance to the All-Ireland colleges "A" senior hurling championship, where they compete for the Dr Croke Cup. Good Counsel, New Ross are the current cup holders.

Wins listed by school

Finals

 Teams in bold went on to win the Dr Croke Cup in the same year.

See also
Schools' Senior A Football
Hogan Cup (All-Ireland Championship)
Connacht Championship
Leinster Championship
Corn Uí Mhuirí (Munster Championship)
MacRory Cup (Ulster Championship)

Schools' Senior A Hurling
Dr Croke Cup (All-Ireland Championship)
Dr Harty Cup (Munster Championship)

Sources
 
 Complete Roll of Honour on Kilkenny GAA bible

References

Hurling competitions in Leinster